Josh Ross (born 1995/1996) is a Canadian country singer and songwriter. He is signed to The Core Entertainment and Universal Music Group. He has charted with the singles "First Taste of Gone" and "On a Different Night".

Early life
Ross grew up near Burlington, Ontario, and spent most of his youth playing sports such as hockey, football, soccer, and motocross. He has extended family in Los Angeles and Maine, and visited the United States often as a child. Ross attended Western University on a football scholarship and was a defensive back. He had hoped to play in the Canadian Football League. A series of injuries coupled with two surgeries derailed his football career in university, and he elected to pursue a career in music as a result. Before his solo career, he initially formed a band in 2016 with Will Finch, a fellow former Western football player, named "Silver Lining". Ross listened to both country and rock music growing up, and cites Steve Earle as one of his biggest musical influences.

Career
While working in construction management, Ross entered several music competitions including the Magna Hoedown in Aurora, Ontario, and the Boots and Hearts Emerging Artists Showcase. He began making trips to Nashville, Tennessee in 2018, with the support of fellow Canadian country artist Aaron Goodvin, before making a permanent move there in 2019. He released his first radio single "If You Were a Song" as an independent artist that year. He released the five-song extended play Do What You Love in 2020.

In February 2022, Ross released the single "First Taste of Gone", which he co-wrote with Mason Thornley. He then became one of the final eight finalists for SiriusXM's "Top of the Country" contest. Ross subsequently signed a joint recording and management deal with The Core Entertainment and Universal Music Canada in April of 2022. With Universal taking over promotion of "First Taste of Gone", the song moved into the top five of the Canada Country chart, and entered the Canadian Hot 100. 

Ross released the song "On a Different Night" in July 2022, which would become a radio single later that September. He received a nomination for "Rising Star" at the 2022 Canadian Country Music Awards. Ross performed at the halftime show for the 109th Grey Cup in Regina, Saskatchewan, alongside Tyler Hubbard and Jordan Davis. In January 2023, Ross released the song "Trouble". He opened for Bailey Zimmerman at the end of his headlining tour in the United States in the same month. In March 2023, Universal Music Group Nashville signed Ross in partnership with Universal Music Canada and The Core. He will join Lee Brice's "Beer Drinking Opportunity Tour" with Tenille Arts in Canada in the spring of 2023. In the summer of 2023, Ross is set to join Nickelback on their North America "Get Rollin' Tour" along with Brantley Gilbert.

Discography

Extended plays

Singles

Other charted songs

Music videos

Awards and Nominations

Notes

References

Living people
Universal Music Group artists
Canadian country singer-songwriters
Canadian male singer-songwriters
Musicians from Ontario
People from Burlington, Ontario
Western Mustangs football players
21st-century Canadian male singers
1995 births